The Structure atlas of human genome (SAHG) is a database of protein-structure-prediction.

See also
Protein structure

References

External links
 http://bird.cbrc.jp/sahg.

Biological databases
Protein structure